Primophaps schoddei  is an extinct genus and species of bird in the pigeon family. It was described from Late Oligocene material (a fossil left coracoid) found at Riversleigh in north-western Queensland, Australia. It was closely related to the Australian bronzewing pigeons, especially those in the genus Phaps. The genus name comes from the Latin primordium, (“beginning” or “origin”), and the Greek phaps (“pigeon”). The specific epithet honours Australian taxonomist Richard Schodde for his work on the relationships of Australian birds.

References

Fossil taxa described in 2012
Columbidae
Oligocene birds
Prehistoric birds of Australia
Riversleigh fauna
Prehistoric bird genera
Extinct monotypic bird genera